Religion in the Philippines is marked by a majority of people being adherents of the Christian faith. At least 88% of the population is Christian; about 79% belong to the Catholic Church while about 9% belong to Protestantism, Orthodoxy, Restorationist and Independent Catholicism and other denominations such as Iglesia Filipina Independiente, Iglesia ni Cristo, Jehovah's Witnesses, Seventh-day Adventist Church, Apostolic Catholic Church, United Church of Christ in the Philippines, Members Church of God International (MCGI) and Pentecostals. Officially, the Philippines is a secular nation, with the Constitution guaranteeing separation of church and state, and requiring the government to respect all religious beliefs equally.

A survey in 2000 reported that about 5% of the population of the Philippines is Muslim, making Islam the second largest religion in the country.  However, A 2012 estimate by the National Commission on Muslim Filipinos (NCMF) stated that there were 10.7 million Muslims, or approximately 11 percent of the total population. The majority of Muslims live in parts of Mindanao, Palawan, and the Sulu Archipelago – an area known as Bangsamoro or the Moro region. Some have migrated into urban and rural areas in different parts of the country, and are highly visible in and around Metro Manila (especially in the 'Muslim Town' district of Quiapo in Manila, Baclaran in Parañaque, parts of Las Piñas, and Maharlika in Pasig), Metro Cebu, Baguio and the Calabarzon region (notably in urbanized towns and cities in Cavite, Laguna, and Batangas). Most Muslim Filipinos practice Sunni Islam according to the Shafi'i school. There are some Ahmadiyya Muslims in the country.

Indigenous Philippine folk religions (collectively referred to as Anitism or Bathalism), the traditional religion of Filipinos which predates Philippine Christianity and Islam, is practiced by an estimated 2% of the population, made up of many indigenous peoples, tribal groups, and people who have reverted into traditional religions from Catholic/Christian or Islamic religions. These religions are often syncretized with Christianity and Islam. Buddhism is practiced by 2% of the population by the Japanese-Filipino community,
 and together with Taoism and Chinese folk religion is also dominant in Chinese communities. There are also smaller number of followers of Sikhism, Hinduism as well. More than 10% of the population is non-religious, with the percentage of non-religious people overlapping with various faiths, as the vast majority of the non-religious select a religion in the Census for nominal purposes.

According to the 2015 census, Evangelicals comprised 2% of the population.  It is particularly strong among American and Korean communities, Northern Luzon especially in Cordillera Administrative Region, Southern Mindanao and many other tribal groups in the Philippines. Protestants both mainline and evangelical have gained significant annual growth rate up to 10% since 1910 to 2015.

Demographics

The Philippine Statistics Authority reported in October 2015 that, based on the 2010 census, % of the total Filipino population were Catholics, 10.8% were Protestant and % were Muslims.

Abrahamic religions

Christianity 

Christianity arrived in the Philippines with the landing of Ferdinand Magellan in 1521. In 1543, Spanish explorer Ruy López de Villalobos named the archipelago Las Islas Filipinas in honor of Philip II of Spain, who was then Prince of Girona and of Asturias under his father, Charles V, Holy Roman Emperor who, as Charles I, was also King of Spain. Missionary activity during the country's colonial rule by Spain and the United States led the transformation of the Philippines into the first and then, along with East Timor, one of two predominantly Catholic nations in East Asia, with approximately 88.66% of the population belonging to the Christian faith.

Catholicism 

Catholicism is the predominant religion and the largest Christian denomination, with estimates of approximately 79.53% of the population belonging to this faith in the Philippines. Spanish efforts to convert many on the islands were aided by the lack of a significant central authority, and by friars who learnt local languages to preach. Some traditional animistic practices blended with the new faith.

The Catholic Church has great influence on Philippine society and politics. One typical event is the role of the Catholic hierarchy during the bloodless People Power Revolution of 1986. Then-Archbishop of Manila and de facto Primate of the Philippines, Jaime Cardinal Sin appealed to the public via radio to congregate along Epifanio de los Santos Avenue in support of rebel forces. Some seven million people responded to the call between February 22–25, and the non-violent protests successfully forced President Ferdinand E. Marcos out of power and into exile in Hawaii.

Several Catholic holidays are culturally important as family occasions, and are observed in the civil calendar. Chief among these are Christmas, which includes celebrations of the civil New Year, and the more solemn Holy Week, which may occur in March or April. Every November, Filipino families celebrate All Saints' Day and All Souls' Day as a single holiday in honour of the saints and the dead, visiting and cleaning ancestral graves, offering prayers, and feasting. As of 2018, Feast of the Immaculate Conception on December 8 was added as a special non-working holiday.

Census data from 2015 found that about 79.53% of the population professed Catholicism.

Papal visits 
 Pope Paul VI was the target of an assassination attempt at Manila International Airport in the Philippines in 1970. The assailant, a Bolivian Surrealist painter named Benjamín Mendoza y Amor Flores, lunged toward Pope Paul with a kris, but was subdued.
 Pope John Paul II visited the country twice, 1981 and 1995. The final Mass of the event was recorded to have been attended by 5 million people, and was at the time the largest papal crowd in history.
 Pope Benedict XVI declined the invitation of Cardinal Gaudencio Rosales and CBCP President Ángel Lagdameo to visit because of a hectic schedule.
 Pope Francis visited the country in January 2015, and the concluding Mass at the Quirino Grandstand had an estimated 7 million attendees, breaking the record at Pope John Paul's Mass at the same site twenty years prior.

Philippine Independent Church 

The Philippine Independent Church (officially Spanish: Iglesia Filipina Independiente, IFI; colloquially known as the Aglipayan Church) is an independent Christian denomination in the form of a nationalist church in the Philippines. Its schism from the Roman Catholic Church was proclaimed in 1902 by the members of the Unión Obrera Democrática Filipina due to the mistreatment of Filipinos by Spanish priests and the execution of nationalist José Rizal under Spanish colonial rule.

Isabelo de los Reyes was one of the initiators of the separation, and suggested that former Roman Catholic priest Gregorio Aglipay be the head of the Church. It is also known as the "Aglipayan Church" after its first Obispo Maximo, Gregorio Aglipay.

Commonly shared beliefs in the Aglipayan Church are the rejection of the Apostolic Succession solely to the Petrine Papacy, the acceptance of priestly ordination of women, the free option of clerical celibacy, the tolerance to join Freemasonry groups, and the advocacy of contraception and same-sex civil rights among its members. Many saints canonised by Rome after the schism are also not officially recognised by the Aglipayan church and its members, but they recognise the popes that have been universally canonised as saints before the schism.

Today, Aglipayans in the Philippines claim to number at least 6 to 8 million members, with most from the northern part of Luzon, especially in the Ilocos Region and in the parts of Visayas like Antique, Iloilo and Guimaras provinces. Congregations are also found throughout the Philippine diaspora in North America, Europe, Middle East and Asia. The Church is the second-largest single Christian denomination in the country after the Roman Catholic Church (some 80.2% of the population), comprising about 6.7% of the total population of the Philippines. By contrast, the 2010 Philippine census recorded only 916,639 members in the country, or about 1% of the population. It has 47 dioceses plus the dioceses outside the Philippines such as the Diocese of Tampa (USA) and the Diocese of Western USA, Western Canada, and Pacific Islands. It has Fellowship congregations in the United Kingdom, United Arab Emirates, Hong Kong and Singapore. IFI is in full communion with the Anglican Churches and The Episcopal Church.

In 2015, the Philippine Independent Church had around 756,225 adherents.

Iglesia ni Cristo 

Iglesia ni Cristo is the largest entirely indigenous-initiated religious organisation in the Philippines comprising roughly 2.6% of religious affiliation in the Philippines. Felix Y. Manalo officially registered the church with the Philippine Government on July 27, 1914 and because of this, most publications refer to him as the founder of the church. Felix Manalo claimed that he was restoring the church of Christ that was lost for 2,000 years. He died on April 12, 1963, aged 76.

The Iglesia ni Cristo is known for its large evangelical missions. The largest of which was the Grand Evangelical Mission (GEM) which also occurred simultaneously on 19 sites across the country. In Manila site alone, more than 600,000 people attended the event. Other programs includes the Lingap sa Mamamayan (Aid to Humanity), The Kabayan Ko Kapatid Ko (My Countrymen, My Brethren) and various resettlement projects for affected individuals.

Jesus Miracle Crusade International Ministry 

The Jesus Miracle Crusade International Ministry (JMCIM) is an apostolic Pentecostal religious group from the Philippines which believes in the gospel of Jesus Christ with signs, wonders,  miracles and faith in God for healing. JMCIM was founded by evangelist Wilde E. Almeda on February 14, 1975.

Members Church of God International 

Members Church of God International (Filipino: Mga Kaanib sa Iglesia ng Dios Internasyonal) is a religious organization popularly known through its Filipino television program, Ang Dating Daan (English Program "The Old Path", in Spanish "El Camino Antiguo", in Portuguese "O Caminho Antigo"). Members Church of God International are one of the Christian majority in the Philippines with more than a million members internationally.

The church is known for their "Bible Expositions", where guests and members are given a chance to ask any biblical question to the "Overall Servant" Eliseo Soriano. He and his associates refute teachings of asked religions which are, according to Soriano, "not biblical" and discuss controversial passages. 
Besides general preaching, they also established charity works. Among these humanitarian services are The Legacy Continues Wish granting activity, MCGI Free Store, Free Meal and Free Potable Water; charity homes for the senior citizens and orphaned children and teenagers; transient homes; medical missions; full college scholarship; start-up capital for livelihood projects; vocational training for the differently-abled; free legal assistance; free bus, jeepney, and train rides for commuters and senior citizens, and; free Bibles for everyone. MCGI is now one of the major blood donor in the Philippines, as acknowledged and awarded by the Philippine National Red Cross' Jose Rizal Award, the highest honor given by PNRC.

Most Holy Church of God in Christ Jesus 
The Most Holy Church of God in Christ Jesus (Filipino: Kabanalbanalang Iglesia ng Dios kay Kristo Hesus), is an independent Christian denomination officially registered in the Philippines by Teofilo D. Ora in May 1922. The Church claims to restore the visible Church founded in Jerusalem by Christ Jesus. It has spread to areas including California, USA; Calgary, Canada, Dubai, UAE and other Asian countries. The Church will be celebrating its centennial anniversary in May 2022.

The church was founded by Bishop Teofilo D. Ora in 1922. He, along with Avelino Santiago and Nicolas Perez, split off from the Iglesia ni Cristo (Church of Christ) in 1922. They initially called their church Iglesia Verdadera de Cristo Hesus (True Church of Christ Jesus). However, following a religious doctrine controversy, Nicolas Perez split off from the group and registered an offshoot called Iglesia ng Dios kay Kristo Hesus, Haligi at Suhay ng Katotohanan (Church of God in Christ Jesus, the Pillar and Support of the Truth). Teofilo D. Ora was bishop until his death in 1969. He was officially succeeded by Bishop Salvador C. Payawal who led the church until 1989. Subsequent bishops were Bishop Gamaliel T. Payawal (1989 to 2003) and Bishop Isagani N. Capistrano (2003–present). It was during Gamaliel Payawal's tenure when the church was renamed as Most Holy Church of God in Christ Jesus.

Apostolic Catholic Church 

Apostolic Catholic Church (Filipino: Apostolika't Katolikang Simbahan) is an Independent Catholic denomination established in 1992 by John Florentine L. Teruel. The ACC has its origin as a Catholic organisation founded in the 1970s in Hermosa, Bataan.

The church started as a mainstream Catholic lay organization that was founded in Hermosa, Bataan in the early 1970s by Maria Virginia P. Leonzon Vda. De Teruel. In 1991 the organisation and the Roman Catholic Church had a schism; due to varying issues, it formally separated itself from the Roman Catholic Church, when John Florentine Teruel was consecrated as a patriarch and registered the church as a Protestant and Independent Catholic denomination.

Today, it has more than 5 million members worldwide. The largest international congregations are in Japan, United States and Canada.

Orthodoxy 

Orthodoxy has been continuously present in the Philippines for more than 200 years. It is represented by two groups, by the Exarchate of the Philippines (a jurisdiction of the Ecumenical Patriarchate of Constantinople governed by the Orthodox Metropolitanate of Hong Kong and Southeast Asia), and by the Antiochian Orthodox Christian Mission in the Philippines (a jurisdiction of the Antiochian Orthodox Church governed by the Antiochian Orthodox Archdiocese of Australia, New Zealand, and All Oceania). In 1999, it was asserted that there were about 560 Orthodox church members in the Philippines.

Protestantism 

Protestantism arrived in the Philippines with the take-over of the islands by Americans at the turn of the 20th century.  In 1898, Spain lost the Philippines to the United States. After a bitter fight for independence against its new occupiers, Filipinos surrendered and were again colonized. The arrival of Protestant American missionaries soon followed. , Protestants comprised about 10%–15% of the population, with an annual growth rate of 10% since 1910 and constitute the largest Christian grouping after Catholicism. Protestants were 10.8% of the population in 2010. Protestant church organizations established in the Philippines during the 20th century include the following:

 Association of Fundamental Baptist Churches in the Philippines
 Awake International Ministries (Evangelical)
 Baptist Bible Fellowship in the Philippines (Baptist)
 Bread of Life Ministries International (Evangelical)
 Cathedral of Praise (Pentecostal)
 Christ's Commission Fellowship (Evangelical)
 Christ Living Epistle Ministries Inc. (Full Gospel/Pentecostal).
 Christian and Missionary Alliance Churches of the Philippines
 Church of God (Cleveland, Tennessee)
 Church of God in Christ (Memphis, Tennessee)
 Church of the Foursquare Gospel in the Philippines (Full Gospel/Pentecostal)
 Church of the Nazarene (Holiness movement)
 Citichurch Cebu (Pentecostal)
 Conservative Baptist Association of the Philippines (Baptist)
 Convention of Philippine Baptist Churches (Baptist)
 Day by Day Christian Ministries (Evangelical)
 Episcopal Church in the Philippines (Anglican)
 Every Nation Churches and Ministries (Pentecostal)
 Grace Christian Church of the Philippines
 Greenhills Christian Fellowship (Conservative Baptist)
 Heartland Covenant Church (formerly Jesus Cares Ministries)
 Iglesia Evangelica Metodista en las Islas Filipinas
 Iglesia Evangelica Unida de Cristo
 Jesus Flock Gateway Church (Full Gospel)
 Jesus Is Lord Church Worldwide (Pentecostal)
 Jesus Miracle Crusade International Ministry (Full Gospel)
 Jesus the Anointed One Church (Pentecostal)
 Lutheran Church in the Philippines (Lutheran)
 Luzon Convention of Southern Baptists (Baptist)
 Mindanao and Visayas Convention of Southern Baptists (Baptist)
 New Life Christian Center (Pentecostal)
 Pentecostal Global Ministries Full Gospel Church (Pentecostal)
 Pentecostal Missionary Church of Christ (4th Watch) (Pentecostal)
 Philippine Evangelical Holiness Churches
 Philippines General Council of the Assemblies of God
 Presbyterian Church of the Philippines
 Redeeming Grace Christian Centre
 The Salvation Army
 Seventh-day Adventist Church
 TEAM Ministries international
 The Blessed Word International Church (Evangelical)
 The United Methodist Church (Methodist)
 Union Church Manila
 Union Espiritista Cristiana de Filipinas (established on 1905)
 United Church of Christ in the Philippines (Congregationalist, Presbyterian, Disciples, United Brethren, Methodist).
 United Evangelical Church of the Philippines
 United Methodist Church https://www.umc.org/en/content/philippines-episcopal-areas
 Victory Christian Fellowship (Evangelical)
 Vineyard Christian Fellowship (Evangelical)
 Word for the World Christian Fellowship (Evangelical)
 Word of Life World Mission Church (Pentecostal)
 Words of Life Christian Ministries
 His Life Ministries (Non-Denominational)
 His Life City Church (Pentecostal)
 City of God Celebration Church. by Bishop Virgilio Senados  {Pentecostal}

The Church of Jesus Christ of Latter-day Saints 

The Church of Jesus Christ of Latter-day Saints (LDS Church) in the Philippines was founded during the Spanish–American War in 1898. Two men from Utah who were members of the United States artillery battery, and who were also set apart as missionaries by the Church before they left the United States, preached while stationed in the Philippines. Missionary work picked up after World War II, and in 1961 the Church was officially registered in the Philippines. In 1969, the Church had spread to eight major islands and had the highest number of baptisms of any area in the Church. Membership was 805,209 in 2019. A temple was built in 1984 which is located in Manila, and a second temple was completed in Cebu City in 2010. As of 2019, four more LDS temples have been announced, they are planned to be built in Urdaneta, Cagayan de Oro, Davao, as well as a second temple in the greater Manila area.

Other Christians 
 The Bible Student movement, from which Jehovah's Witnesses later developed, was introduced to the Philippines in 1912, when the president of the Watch Tower Society, Charles Taze Russell, gave a talk at the former Manila Grand Opera House. In 1993, a Supreme Court case involving the Witnesses resulted in the reversal of an earlier 1959 Supreme Court decision and in upholding "the right of children of Jehovah's Witnesses to refrain from saluting the flag, reciting the pledge of allegiance, and singing the national anthem." As of 2021, there were officially 235,736 active members in the Philippines in 3,504 congregations nationwide. Their 2021 observance of the annual Memorial of Christ's death attracted an attendance of 739,439 in the country. 
The Kingdom of Jesus Christ, the Name Above Every Name was founded by Pastor Apollo C. Quiboloy on September 1, 1985. Pastor Quiboloy claims to be the "Appointed" Son of God, that salvation is through him, that he is the residence of the God the Father and that he restores the Kingdom of God in the gentile settings.
 The Seventh-day Adventist Church was founded by Ellen G. White, which is best known for its teaching that Saturday, the seventh day of the week, is the Sabbath, and that the second advent of Christ is imminent. Colloquially called Sabadístas by outsiders, Filipino Adventists numbered 571,653 in 88,706 congregations as of 2007, and with an annual membership growth rate of 5.6%.
 United Pentecostal Church International (Oneness) originated in the United States as an offshoot of the Pentecostal movements in the 1920s. The church is a proponent of the belief of modalism to describe God, and is non-trinitarian in its conception of God.
 Jesus Christ To God be the Glory (Friends Again) was founded by Luis Ruíz Santos in 1988.
 Churches of Christ (Churches of Christ 33 AD/the Stone-Campbellites) is a restorationist movement that distinctly believes in a set of steps or ways to attain salvation, among of which is prerequisite immersion baptism.
Loyal Singles for Jesus Ministry, founded by EJ Tingey in 2018. He claims that true salvation is achieved by being loyal to God and women.
 True Jesus Church a "oneness" movement that started in the People's Republic of China.
 Jesus is Our Shield Worldwide Ministries (commonly known as Oras ng Himala, "Hour of Miracle[s]") was founded by Renato D. Carillo, who claims to be the end-times apostle.
 Universal Church of the Kingdom of God (UCKG Help Center) was founded by Edir Macedo in 1977 in Brazil.
 Unification Church, founded by Sun Myung Moon in what is today South Korea.
Jesus is I.L Church, founded by I.L Noval in 2011. The church has exponentially expanded since then and now has about 76,000 members.

Islam 

Islam reached the Philippines in the 14th century with the arrival of Muslim traders from the Persian Gulf, Southern India, and their followers from several sultanate governments in Maritime Southeast Asia. Islam's predominance reached all the way to the shores of Manila Bay, home to several Muslim kingdoms. During the Spanish conquest, Islam had a rapid decline as the predominant monotheistic faith in the Philippines as a result of the introduction of Roman Catholicism by Spanish missionaries and via the Spanish Inquisition. The southern Filipino tribes were among the few indigenous Filipino communities that resisted Spanish rule and conversions to Roman Catholicism. The vast majority of Muslims in Philippines follow Sunni Islam of Shafi school of jurisprudence, with small Shia and Ahmadiyya minorities. Islam is the oldest recorded monotheistic religion in the Philippines.

, according to the Philippine Statistics Authority, the Muslim population of Philippines in 2015 was 6.01%. However, a 2012 estimate by the National Commission on Muslim Filipinos (NCMF) stated that there were 10.7 million Muslims,  or approximately 11 percent of the total population. Some Muslim scholars have observed that difficulties in getting accurate numbers have been compounded in some Muslim areas by the hostility of the inhabitants to government personnel, leading to difficulty in getting accurate data for the Muslim population in the country. The majority of Muslims live in Mindanao and nearby islands.

History 

In 1380 Karim ul' Makhdum the first Arabian trader reached the Sulu Archipelago and Jolo in the Philippines and through trade throughout the island established Islam in the country. In 1390 the Minangkabau's Prince Rajah Baguinda and his followers preached Islam on the islands. The Sheik Karimal Makdum Mosque was the first mosque established in the Philippines on Simunul in Mindanao in the 14th century. Subsequent settlements by Arab missionaries traveling to Malaysia and Indonesia helped strengthen Islam in the Philippines and each settlement was governed by a Datu, Rajah and a Sultan.

By the next century conquests had reached the Sulu islands in the southern tip of the Philippines where the population was animistic and they took up the task of converting the animistic population to Islam with renewed zeal. By the 15th century, half of Luzon (Northern Philippines) and the islands of Mindanao in the south had become subject to the various Muslim sultanates of Borneo and much of the population in the South were converted to Islam. However, the Visayas was largely dominated by Hindu-Buddhist societies led by rajahs and datus who strongly resisted Islam. One reason could be due to the economic and political disasters prehispanic Muslim pirates from the Mindanao region bring during raids. These frequent attacks gave way to naming present-day Cebu as then-Sugbo or scorched earth which was a defensive technique implemented by the Visayans so the pirates have nothing much to loot.

Moro (derived from the Spanish word meaning Moors) is the appellation inherited from the Spaniards, for Filipino Muslims and tribal groups of Mindanao. The Moros seek to establish an independent Islamic province in Mindanao to be named Bangsamoro. The term Bangsamoro is a combination of an Old Malay word meaning nation or state with the Spanish word Moro. A significant Moro rebellion occurred during the Philippine–American War. Conflicts and rebellion have continued in the Philippines from the pre-colonial period up to the present.

Muslim Mindanao 

The Autonomous Region in Muslim Mindanao (ARMM) comprises the Philippines' predominantly Muslim provinces, namely: Basilan (except Isabela City), Lanao del Sur, Maguindanao, Sulu and Tawi-Tawi, and the Islamic City of Marawi. It is the only region with its own government. The regional capital is at Cotabato City, although this city is outside of its jurisdiction.

Judaism 

In the 1590s some Jews fleeing from the Inquisition were recorded to have come to the Philippines. In 2006, Metro Manila boasted the largest Jewish community in the Philippines, which consisted of roughly 100 families. , the Jewish population comprised between 100 and 300 individuals, depending on one's definition of Jew.

The country's only synagogue, Beth Yaacov, is located in Makati. There are other Jews elsewhere in the country, but these are much fewer and almost all transients, either diplomats or business envoys, and their existence is almost totally unknown in mainstream society. There are a few Israelis in Manila recruiting caregivers for Israel, some work in call centers, entrepreneurs, and a few other executives.

Other religions

Buddhism 

No written record exists about the early Buddhism in the Philippines. However, archaeological discoveries and the few scant references in the other nations' historical records can tell about the existence of Buddhism from the 9th century onward in the islands. These records mention the independent states that comprise the Philippines and which show that they were not united as one country in the early days. Archaeological finds include Buddhist artifacts. The style are of Vajrayana influence.

Loanwords with Buddhist context appear in languages of the Philippines. Archaeological finds include Buddhist artifacts. The style are of Vajrayana influence.
The Philippines's early states must have become the tributary states of the powerful Buddhist Srivijaya empire that controlled the trade and its sea routes from the 6th century to the 13th century in Southeast Asia. The states's trade contacts with the empire long before or in the 9th century must have served as the conduit for introducing Vajrayana Buddhism to the islands.

Both Srivijaya empire in Sumatra and Majapahit empire in Java were unknown in history until 1918 when the Ecole Francaise d'Extreme Orient's George Coedes postulated their existence because they had been mentioned in the records of the Chinese Tang and Sung imperial dynasties. Ji Ying, a Chinese monk and scholar, stayed in Sumatra from 687 to 689 on his way to India. He wrote on the Srivijaya's splendour, "Buddhism was flourishing throughout the islands of Southeast Asia. Many of the kings and the chieftains in the islands in the southern seas admire and believe in Buddhism, and their hearts are set on accumulating good action."

Both empires replaced their early Theravada Buddhist religion with Vajrayana Buddhism in the 7th century.

In 2016, Buddhism was practiced by around 2% of the population,according to the Permanent Mission of the Republic of the Philippines to the United Nations. concentrated among Filipinos of Chinese descent and Filipinos of Japanese descent and there are several prominent Buddhist temples in the country like Seng Guan Temple in Manila and Lon Wa Buddhist Temple in Mindanao.

Hinduism 

The Srivijaya Empire and Majapahit Empire on what is now Malaysia and Indonesia, introduced Hinduism and Buddhism to the islands. Ancient statues of Hindu-Buddhist gods have been found in the Philippines dating as far back as 600 to 1600 years from present.

The archipelagos of Southeast Asia were under the influence of Hindu Tamil people, Gujarati people and Indonesian traders through the ports of Malay-Indonesian islands. Indian religions, possibly an amalgamated version of Hindu-Buddhist arrived in Philippines archipelago in the 1st millennium, through the Indonesian kingdom of Srivijaya followed by Majapahit. Archeological evidence suggesting exchange of ancient spiritual ideas from India to the Philippines includes the 1.79 kilogram, 21 carat gold Hindu goddess Agusan (sometimes referred to as Golden Tara), found in Mindanao in 1917 after a storm and flood exposed its location.

Another gold artifact, from the Tabon caves in the island of Palawan, is an image of Garuda, the bird who is the mount of Vishnu. The discovery of sophisticated Hindu imagery and gold artifacts in Tabon caves has been linked to those found from Oc Eo, in the Mekong Delta in Southern Vietnam. These archaeological evidence suggests an active trade of many specialized goods and gold between India and Philippines and coastal regions of Vietnam and China. Golden jewelry found so far include rings, some surmounted by images of Nandi – the sacred bull, linked chains, inscribed gold sheets, gold plaques decorated with repoussé images of Hindu deities.

Today Hinduism is largely confined to the Indian Filipinos and the expatriate Indian community.  There are temples also for Sikhism, also located in the provinces and in the cities, sometimes located near Hindu temples. The two Paco temples are well known, comprising a Hindu temple and a Sikh temple.

There are two Hindu temples in Manila city: Hari Ram Temple (Paco) and Saya Aur Devi Mandir Temple (Paco).  There is a Hindu temple called "Indian Hindu Temple" in Cebu City, Philippines. There is a Hindu Temple in Baguio, Philippines called "Baguio Hindu Temple". The population of Hindus in the Philippines is 30,634

Baháʼí Faith 

The Baháʼí Faith in the Philippines started in 1921 with the first Baháʼí first visiting the Philippines that year, and by 1944 a Baháʼí Local Spiritual Assembly was established. In the early 1960s, during a period of accelerated growth, the community grew from 200 in 1960 to 1000 by 1962 and 2000 by 1963. In 1964 the National Spiritual Assembly of the Baháʼís of the Philippines was elected and by 1980 there were 64,000 Baháʼís and 45 local assemblies. The Baháʼís have been active in multi/inter-faith developments. The 2010 World Christian Encyclopedia estimates the Philippines has the world's sixth largest population of Baháʼís, at just over 275,000.

Indigenous religions 

Indigenous Philippine folk religions, also referred to as Anitism, are a body of myths, tales, and superstitions held by Filipinos (composed of more than a hundred ethnic peoples in the Philippines), mostly originating from beliefs held during the pre-Hispanic era. Some of these beliefs stem from pre-Christian religions that were specially influenced by Hinduism and were regarded by the Spanish as "myths" and "superstitions" in an effort to de-legitimize precolonial beliefs. Today, some of these precolonial beliefs are still held by many Filipinos, both in urban and rural areas.

Philippine mythology is incorporated from various sources, having similarities with Indonesian and Malay myths, as well as Hindu, Muslim, Buddhist, and Christian traditions, such as the notion of heaven (kaluwalhatian, kalangitan, kamurawayan, etc.), hell (kasamaan, sulad, etc.), and the human soul (kaluluwa, kaulolan, etc.). Philippine mythology attempts to explain the nature of the world through the lives and actions of deities (gods, goddesses), heroes, and mythological creatures. The majority of these myths were passed on through oral tradition, and preserved through the aid of community spiritual leaders or shamans (babaylan, katalonan, mumbaki, baglan, machanitu, walian, mangubat, bahasa, etc.) and community elders.

Today, many ethnic peoples continue to practice and conserve their unique indigenous religions, notably in ancestral domains, although foreign and foreign-inspired Hispanic and Arabic religions continue to interfere with their life-ways through conversions, land-grabbing, inter-marriage, and/or land-buying. Various scholarly works have been made regarding Anitism and its many topics, although much of its stories and traditions are still undocumented by the international anthropological and folkloristic community.

The 2020 census recorded around 0.1% of the population as practicing Philippine traditional religions, concentrating in the Cordillera Administrative Region, Palawan, Mindoro, Western Visayas, and Mindanao. Specific communities throughout the Philippines also adhere to Anitism, while more than 90% of the Philippine national population continue to believe in certain Anitist belief system, despite adhering to another religion.

Revitalization attempts
In search of a national culture and identity, away from those imposed by Spain during the colonial age, Filipino revolutionaries during the Philippine revolution proposed to revive the indigenous Philippine folk religions and make them the national religion of the entire country. The Katipunan opposed the religious teachings of the Spanish friars, saying that they "obscured rather than explained religious truths." After the revival of the Katipunan during the Spanish–American War, an idealized form of the folk religions was proposed by some, with the worship of God under the ancient name of Bathala, which applies to all supreme deities under the many ethnic pantheons in the Philippines.

No religion 

The Philippine Statistics Authority in 2015 puts the number of irreligious at less than 0.1%.

The Philippine Atheists and Agnostics Society (PATAS) is a nonprofit organization for the public understanding of atheism and agnosticism in the Philippines which educates society, and eliminates myths and misconceptions about atheism and agnosticism. In February 2009, Filipino Freethinkers was formed. Since 2011, the Philippine Atheists and Agnostics Society has held its OUT Campaigns in Rizal Park and Quezon Memorial Circle. Also it held two feeding programs "Good without Religion" in Bacoor, Cavite. The society also is a member affiliate and associate of various international atheist organizations such as the Atheist Alliance International, Institute for Science and Human Values, and the International Humanist and Ethical Union, as one among secular organizations that promotes free thought and scientific development in the Philippines. The 2015 Philippine Census reported the religion of about 0.02% of the population as "none".

As of 2021, the Philippine Atheists and Agnostics Society is dormant and non-active, following a major internal scandal on finance matters.

Religion and politics 

The 1987 Constitution of the Philippines declares: The separation of Church and State shall be inviolable. (Article II, Section 6), and, No law shall be made respecting an establishment of religion, or prohibiting the free exercise thereof. The free exercise and enjoyment of religious profession and worship, without discrimination or preference, shall forever be allowed. No religious test shall be required for the exercise of civil or political rights. (Article III, Section 5). Joaquin Bernas, a Filipino Jesuit specializing in constitutional law, acknowledges that there were complex issues that were brought to court and numerous attempts to use the separation of Church and State against the Catholic Church, but he defends the statement, saying that "the fact that he [Marcos] tried to do it does not deny the validity of the separation of church and state".

On April 28, 2004, the Philippines Supreme Court reversed the ruling of a lower court ordering five religious leaders to refrain from endorsing a candidate for elective office. Manila Judge Conception Alarcon-Vergara had ruled that the 
"head of a religious organization who influences or threatens to punish members could be held liable for coercion and violation of citizen's right to vote freely". The lawsuit filed by Social Justice Society party stated that "the Church's active participation in partisan politics, using the awesome voting strength of its faithful flock, will enable it to elect men to public office who will in turn be forever beholden to its leaders, enabling them to control the government".

They claimed that this violates the Philippine constitution's separation of Church and State clause. The named respondents were the Archbishop of Manila Cardinal Luis Antonio Tagle, El Shaddai Movement Leader Mike Velarde, Iglesia ni Cristo Executive Minister Eduardo V. Manalo and Jesus Is Lord Church Worldwide leader Eddie Villanueva. Manalo's Iglesia ni Cristo practices bloc voting. Former Catholic Archbishop Jaime Cardinal Sin had been instrumental in rallying support for the assumption to power of Corazon Aquino and Gloria Arroyo. Velarde supported Fidel V. Ramos, Joseph Estrada, Gloria Macapagal Arroyo and Benigno Aquino III while Villanueva endorsed Fidel Ramos and Jose De Venecia. The papal nuncio agreed with the decision of the lower court while the other respondents challenged the decision.

See also 

 Cebu Taoist Temple
 Ma-Cho Temple
 List of mosques in the Philippines
 Demographics of the Philippines
 Funeral practices and burial customs in the Philippines
 Religion in pre-colonial Philippines

References